Thiago Campos Santos or simply Thiago Campos (born January 23, 1984 in Rio de Janeiro), is a Brazilian central defender. He currently plays for Goytacaz on loan from Flamengo.

Honours
Campeão Carioca: 2004
Ceará State League: 2007

Contract
Goytacaz (Loan) 21 August 2007 to 31 December 2007
Flamengo 1 January 2007 to 31 December 2007

External links
 sambafoot

1984 births
Living people
CR Flamengo footballers
Goytacaz Futebol Clube players
Fortaleza Esporte Clube players
Association football defenders
Footballers from Rio de Janeiro (city)
Brazilian footballers